is a 1935 Japanese musical drama film directed by Yoshitsugu Tanaka, with cinematography and special effects by Eiji Tsuburaya. Produced by J.O. Studios (later Toho), it is based on the 10th century Japanese literary tale The Tale of the Bamboo Cutter. In the film, Princess Kaguya was raised by a couple who spread rumors that she had ascended a mountain in order to deceive suitors and ran away with her son and the princess. The film was considered lost until the British Film Institute found a 35mm cut in May 2015.

Cast 
 Kazuko Kitazawa as Princess Kaguya
 Yō Shiomi as Okina
 Hideko Higashi as Ōna, Okina's wife
 Ichirō Fujiyama as Zomaro
 Dekao Yokoo as the Prime Minister
 Tamaki Tokuyama as Tamaro, the Prime Minister's son
 Kinji Fujiwa as Hosomi, the Prime Minister's son
 Hyō Kitazawa

Production

Special effects 
Famed special effects director Eiji Tsuburaya worked on the film's effects, which are regarded as a major advancement in Japanese visual effects. Miniatures and synthetic techniques were used to recreate the town of Kyoto.

Kenzō Masaoka supervised the miniature effects for the film. He would later recall in Kinema Junpo: "We tried to create our own frame-by-frame shots for the oxcarts, which I think was the first time this [technique] was attempted in Japan. We shot about ten plaster figures of oxen in various stages of movement, and then animated them by replacing these static models frame-by-frame. These plaster figures were the masterpieces of Takefu Asano, and took a period of more than one month to sculpt."

Release 
The Japan Association of London organized a screening in 1936 for local subsidiaries, and requested the Embassy of Japan to "prepare a film about Japanese myths and legends." In addition to not having a screening record since its release, the location of the film was also unknown. The British Film Institute (BFI) received information in May 2015 regarding a flammable positive film of the film. A researcher at the National Film Archive investigated the film at the BFI Preservation Center in October of the same year and determined that it was a shortened version of the film. The shortened version of the film was released in Japan on September 4, 2021, after negotiations with the BFI for six years.

See also 
 List of rediscovered films

Notes

References

Sources

External links 
 
 Princess Kaguya at the official Toho website (archived) 

1935 films
1930s Japanese-language films
Tokusatsu films
Japanese black-and-white films
Japanese fantasy drama films
Japanese fantasy adventure films
Kaguya-hime
1930s rediscovered films
Rediscovered Japanese films